Pollenia vera is a species of cluster fly in the family Polleniidae.

Distribution
Austria, Bulgaria, Czech Republic, France, Greece, Hungary, Moldova, Poland, Romania, Slovakia, Ukraine, Yugoslavia.

References

Polleniidae
Insects described in 1936
Diptera of Europe